Biviere Lake is a lake in the Province of Messina, Sicily, Italy. At an elevation of 1325 m, its surface area is 0.18 km².

Lakes of Sicily